Figure skating at the 2019 Children of Asia International Sports Games was held from 13-15 February in Yuzhno-Sakhalinsk, Russia. Medals were awarded at the junior level in men's singles and ladies' singles.

Regulations 
Skaters who were born between 1 January 2003 and 31 December 2005 are eligible to compete at the 1st Winter Children of Asia International Sports Games.

Events

Medal table

Entries

Results

Boys

Girls

References

Figure skating competitions
International sports competitions hosted by Russia
Winter Children of Asia International Sports Games
Sport in Yuzhno-Sakhalinsk